Williamson may refer to:

Places
Williamson, Arizona
Williamson, Georgia
Williamson, Illinois
Williamson, Iowa
Williamson, New York, a town in Wayne County, New York.
Williamson (CDP), New York, a hamlet and census-designated place in Wayne County, New York.
Williamson, West Virginia
Williamson County, Illinois
Williamson County, Tennessee
Williamson County, Texas

People
Williamson (surname)

Other uses
Williamson v. Lee Optical Co., a 1955 U.S. Supreme Court case
Williamson amplifier, a type of push-pull audio amplifier with low distortion first designed in 1947
Williamson Road Junior Public School, an elementary school in Toronto, Ontario
Williamson ether synthesis, one of the most common methods for preparing ethers

See also
Williams (disambiguation)
Williamston (disambiguation)
Williamstown (disambiguation)
Justice Williamson (disambiguation)
Wilson (disambiguation)